Katz Drug Store was a regional chain of pharmacies in the Midwestern United States.

History
In 1914, two brothers named Ike and Mike Katz opened two drug stores in Kansas City, Missouri. One was located on 8th Street and Grand Avenue and the second inside the "Argyle Building" on 12th and McGee Street. At the start of WWI, the Katz Drug Stores became famous because they were allowed to stay open past 6 pm, despite wartime curfews on nonessential businesses. They also absorbed the new 10% tax on cigarettes instead of passing the cost to customers, which was incorporated into their new slogan “Katz pays the tax!” Katz also sold more than just drugs: each store had a small grocery store with a soda fountain and lunch counter and sold small home appliances, music records, Katz-branded beer, and even live animals.

The Katz Drug Store sit-in was one of the first protests of its kind during the civil rights movement, occurring on August 19, 1958, in Oklahoma City, Oklahoma. In protest of racial discrimination, black schoolchildren sat at a lunch counter with their teacher, demanding to be served and refusing to leave until they were. They sought to end the racial segregation of eating places in their city, sparking a sit-in movement in Oklahoma City that lasted for years.

Katz focused on low-cost branding, and they quickly grew to 65 stores in 5 states. At their peak, they generated over $100 million in annual sales and employed over 3,000 people from different positions like soda jerks to vice presidents. Soon self-service chain stores became more popular in the late 1960s and early 1970s, so Katz began losing market share. Katz sold itself in 1971 to Skaggs Drug Centers, which eventually merged with Osco Drug, which eventually merged with CVS Pharmacy.

References

Pharmacy brands
Defunct pharmacies of the United States
American companies established in 1914
Retail companies established in 1914